Subcommander Marcos: The Man and the Mask is a 2007 biography of Subcomandante Marcos by Nick Henck.

Bibliography

External links 

 
 E-book

2007 non-fiction books
English-language books
Duke University Press books
Biographies (books)